Ibibongo Nduita (born 30 June 1962) is a Congolese boxer. He competed in the men's bantamweight event at the 1988 Summer Olympics.

References

External links
 

1962 births
Living people
Democratic Republic of the Congo male boxers
Olympic boxers of the Democratic Republic of the Congo
Boxers at the 1988 Summer Olympics
Place of birth missing (living people)
Bantamweight boxers
21st-century Democratic Republic of the Congo people